Shahindere Bërlajolli (August 7, 1946, Peć – May 3, 2020, Gostivar) is a singer of Albanian popular music born in Kosovo.

Biography	
Born and raised in Peć, she went there for primary and secondary school and studied education. She came from a prominent local family, including her businessman father Mustafë Bërlajolli and her philanthropist mother Igballe. She was at the time the most prominent artist to come from her town.

In 1959, at the age of 13, she appeared at a regional music festival called Mikrofoni është juaji ("The Microphone Is Yours"). She won the national Akordet e Kosovës prize five times and had hits such as "Në zabel të erdha,“ “Miriban," “Kush ma i pari bani," “Gajdexhiu," “O bylbyl me pika-pika," and "Hajde dalim moj goce." She recorded 280 songs in total, mostly at Radio Television of Kosovo.

References

Kosovan singers